Steve Levitt (born February 29, 1960) is an American actor who has appeared in films and on television. He is best known for his role in the 1987 movie Hunk as Bradley Brinkman and a recurring role in the Showtime TV series The Paper Chase.

Levitt's first feature film was in the 1980 movie Those Lips, Those Eyes, he also appeared in the 1983 comedy movie Private School as a bellboy. He appeared in the 1986 film Last Resort and The Experts in 1989.

Levitt has starred in TV movies such as Bill (1981), Malibu (1983), The Incredible Hulk Returns (1988) as Donald Blake, and Get Smart, Again! (1989). He starred in the short lived TV series The Boys as Gil.

Levitt jumped behind the camera in 1993, writing and directing a 30 min film entitled DEAF HEAVEN about the AIDS crises. He followed that up by penning the Val Kilmer film At First Sight (1999). He went on to write scripts for almost all major studios before retiring in 2011.

In 2017 Levitt married long-time girlfriend Phoebe Dutch. The two had been romantically involved since 1997.
At present, Steve Levitt is a Buddhist teacher and a Buddhist chaplain at Cedars-Sinai hospital in Los Angeles.

External links

American male film actors
American male television actors
20th-century American male actors
Living people
1960 births